Kamena may refer to two villages in Bosnia and Herzegovina, formerly a single village:

 Kamena, Istočni Mostar, in Republika Srpska
 Kamena, Mostar, in the Federation of Bosnia and Herzegovina